Denis Alekseyevich Petrov (born 3 March 1968) is a Russian former pair skater who competed for the Soviet Union, the Commonwealth of Independent States, and the Unified Team. With his then-wife Elena Bechke, he is the 1992 Olympic silver medalist, the 1989 World bronze medalist, a two-time European silver medalist (1991–92), 1992 Soviet national champion.

Career 
Petrov began skating with Elena Bechke, two years his senior, in 1987. They trained with Tamara Moskvina at the Yubileyny Sports Palace in St. Petersburg. They won their first international title at the 1988 Grand Prix International de Paris, although they missed the 1988 Olympic team as they finished fourth at the Soviet Figure Skating Championships. Their first appearance at the Worlds was at the 1989 World Championships. Again, Bechke/Petrov had finished fourth and initially did not qualify for the Soviet Worlds team, but they won a skate-off to replace an injured team. They captured the bronze medal at their first Worlds showing, but they again placed fourth at the Soviet Nationals in 1990, missing the World Championships. In 1991, they placed third at the Nationals and fourth at the Worlds. In 1992, they won the Soviet Nationals over the teams of Evgenia Shishkova / Vadim Naumov and Marina Eltsova / Andrei Bushkov (Bechke/Petrov's training partners and chief rivals, Natalia Mishkutenok / Artur Dmitriev, missed the Nationals but qualified for the Olympics as they were the reigning World Champions). Bechke/Petrov also won silver medals at the 1991 and 1992 European Championships, and the silver medal at the 1992 Winter Olympics behind Mishkutenok/Dmitriev. Their choreographer was Alexander Matveev. They retired from amateur competition after the 1992 Worlds.

After turning professional in 1992, the pair steadily improved as competitors and performers. They won every single competition they entered in 1996, including the World Professional Championships. They placed second at their last World Professional Championships, in 1999. The pair toured with Stars on Ice for seven years (1994–2000). They resided and trained as professionals in Lake Placid, New York, before relocating to Richmond, Virginia, in 1997 to train and coach there. Bechke retired from skating after the 1999–2000 season, while Petrov continued to skate with Stars on Ice for another two seasons.

Bechke/Petrov were known for their great posture and lines, inventive moves (such as the "Impossible" death spiral), great unison and proximity on their jumps and side-by-side spins, as well as many difficult and intricate lift sequences. Scott Hamilton once joked that Petrov is such a strong and consistent skater that he only falls once a year. Hamilton has also said that the Stars on Ice cast nicknamed him "Conan" for getting bigger after every tour, while Kristi Yamaguchi has said that he is also nicknamed "the human crane" because he has lifted just about everybody in the show, including performing a two-hand detroiter with Scott Hamilton in the 2000–01 group number, "Tunnel Vision."

Petrov and his wife work at the World Ice Arena in Shenzhen, she as the manager and he as the head coach of the skating academy.

Personal life 
Petrov was born on 3 March 1968, in Leningrad, Russian SFSR, Soviet Union. He began dating Elena Bechke in 1988 and the two married in 1990. They said that their friendship and skating improved after their divorce in 1995.

On 8 July 2005, Petrov married Chinese figure skater Chen Lu, whom he met on the 1998–99 Stars on Ice tour. They lived in Hong Kong before moving to Shenzhen, China. Their son, Nikita, was born on 27 June 2006, and their daughter, Anastasia, on 8 July 2009, both in Shenzhen.

Programs 
(with Bechke)

Competitive highlights 
(with Bechke)

References

External links

Navigation

1968 births
Living people
Russian male pair skaters
Soviet male pair skaters
Olympic figure skaters of the Unified Team
Figure skaters at the 1992 Winter Olympics
Olympic silver medalists for the Unified Team
Figure skaters from Saint Petersburg
Olympic medalists in figure skating
World Figure Skating Championships medalists
European Figure Skating Championships medalists
Medalists at the 1992 Winter Olympics
Goodwill Games medalists in figure skating
Competitors at the 1990 Goodwill Games